Vladimír Havlík (born February 7, 1959) is a Czech action artist, painter and pedagogue.

Education
Havlík was educated at Palacký University (1978–1983) under the tutelage of Prof. Alena Nádvorníková, and at Jan Evangelista Purkyně University (1999).

Action art
Art historian Pavlína Morganová has described Havlík's key role in the early days of Czechoslovakian action art:

According to Czech curator and art historian Tomáš Pospiszyl,

In 2015, on being awarded the annual Umělec má cenu prize in Olomouc, where he lives, Havlík reflected that he is always interested in "experiencing actions again" in the same places where he had initially practiced action art under the Czech communist regime during the 1980s. Moreover, nowadays he enjoys doing so in collaboration with younger artists such as Barborou Klímovou.

References

Further reading
Havlík, V., Actions and Interventions 1978–1988 (Bratislava: Sputnik Editions, 2012).

External links
Havlík, Yesterday (autobiographical silent film), Artyčok.tv, 1983–2008.
Havlík, Němý film (Silent Movie, a remake of Yesterday and I Cut My Hair), Artyčok.tv, 2013.

1959 births
Palacký University Olomouc alumni
Czech performance artists
20th-century Czech painters
Czech male painters
People from Nové Město na Moravě
Living people
20th-century Czech male artists